Johnny Dangerously is a 1984 American crime comedy film, and a parody of 1930s crime/gangster movies. It was directed by Amy Heckerling.

The film stars Michael Keaton as an honest, goodhearted man who turns to a life of crime to finance his mother's skyrocketing medical bills and to put his younger brother through law school. Joe Piscopo, Marilu Henner, Maureen Stapleton, Peter Boyle, Griffin Dunne, Dom DeLuise, Danny DeVito, Dick Butkus and Alan Hale, Jr. were in the film.

Part of the film's comedic appeal is the clever and frequent use of malapropisms by Johnny and other crime characters, especially in instances where curse words were intended.

Plot
In 1935, a pet shop owner catches a young boy shoplifting a puppy. To discourage the kid from a life of crime, the owner tells a story by way of a flashback.

In 1910, Johnny Kelly is a poor but honest newsboy in New York City. Johnny's mother, Ma Kelly, needs an operation that his family cannot afford. Since Johnny's criminal father was executed, Ma has supported her sons by doing other people's laundry. Johnny's younger brother, Tommy, is fascinated by the law. Johnny gets into a street fight with a boy named Danny Vermin, which attracts the notice of local crime boss Jocko Dundee, who offers Johnny a job. Seeing no honest way to earn the money for his mother's operation, Johnny agrees, even though it would break his mother's heart. He helps rob a rival nightclub belonging to Roman Moronie, a malapropist of swear words. Moronie claims he never forgets a "fargin'" face. When Jocko asks Johnny for his name, he replies Johnny Dangerously.

Years pass. With Ma Kelly's continuing medical problems, Johnny decides to work for Dundee full-time. Everyone knows that Kelly is really Johnny Dangerously, except for Ma and Tommy, who think he owns a nightclub. Similarly, the gang knows nothing of Johnny's mother and brother. One day, Johnny comes to Dundee's headquarters to find he has taken on two new gang members: Danny Vermin, and his sidekick Dutch. Danny has become a "total scumbag" who uses opera audiences as shooting galleries. As the two gangs continue to war, Johnny falls for Lil Sheridan, a young showgirl new to the big city. Eventually, Johnny becomes the boss of the Dundee gang and negotiates a truce with Moronie.

Eventually, Tommy graduates from law school, unknowingly funded by Johnny's illicit earnings. He goes to work for the District Attorney's office, under D.A. Burr, who is on Johnny's payroll. Burr tries to sidetrack Tommy, who has become a major public figure after hearings look into Moronie's activities. Meanwhile, Burr and Vermin conspire to kill Tommy by cutting the brakes on his car. Tommy is badly injured, but survives. Johnny has Burr killed in revenge, which leaves Tommy as the new District Attorney. Vermin discovers that Dangerously is the D.A.'s brother, and Tommy overhears Vermin chortling about it. Tommy confronts Johnny, who agrees to turn over the evidence against himself to the Crime Commissioner. However, as Johnny enters the Commissioner's office, he finds him dead, and Vermin knocks him out and frames Johnny for the murder.

Johnny is arrested, but insists he was framed. He realizes that his lucky cigarette case is missing, and that whoever actually has it is the guilty party. Nonetheless, Johnny is found guilty, sentenced to the electric chair and sent to Death Row. But when Vermin congratulates Tommy, he drops Johnny's cigarette case. Pocketing the case, Tommy realizes Johnny really is innocent, and that Vermin is the actual perpetrator. Johnny arrives on Death Row, where he receives rock star treatment from the starstruck warden. Johnny hears word that Tommy is in danger and plots an escape—with the rather strange request to the warden to move up his execution to that very night. As he is taken to the chair, Johnny assembles what looks like a tommy gun from parts handed to him by inmates. He escapes in a laundry truck driven by Lil Sheridan. Johnny, by way of a wild car chase (involving peeling off several layers of shelf paper on the truck), arrives at a movie theatre where Vermin and Dutch are behind the screen, planning to kill Tommy. Johnny runs to the front row, sees Vermin's gun barrel, jumps in front of Tommy and shoots through the screen. He wounds Vermin, and both learn that Johnny's cigarette case—on Tommy's person at the time—took Vermin's bullet. Vermin is arrested as the governor pardons Johnny.

The story returns to 1935. The young shoplifter is starstruck. Johnny wraps up his story and sends the boy off with a kitten and the lesson "crime doesn't pay." When the boy leaves, Johnny changes into a tuxedo and heads off in a limo with Lil, looking at the camera and admitting: "Well, it paid a little!"

Cast

 Michael Keaton as Johnny Kelly (a.k.a. Johnny Dangerously)
 Byron Thames as young Johnny
 Joe Piscopo as Danny Vermin
 Georg Olden as young Danny
 Marilu Henner as Lil Sheridan
 Maureen Stapleton as Ma Kelly
 Peter Boyle as Jocko Dundee
 Richard Dimitri as Roman Troy Moronie
 Griffin Dunne as Tommy Kelly
 Troy Slaten as young Tommy
 Dom DeLuise as The Pope
 Danny DeVito as Burr
 Dick Butkus as Arthur
 Alan Hale, Jr. as the Desk Sergeant
 Glynnis O'Connor as Sally
 Ron Carey as Pat
 Ray Walston as Vendor
 Neal Israel as Dr. Zilman
 Joe Flaherty (uncredited) as Death Row inmate

Music
The theme song "This Is the Life" was written for the film by "Weird Al" Yankovic, though for legal reasons, the song was not featured on home video releases of the film, until the DVD was released in 2002. The VHS home video version of the film featured a version of the Cole Porter song "Let's Misbehave". The music video for Yankovic's song incorporates scenes from the movie.

Critical reception
The film received mixed reviews and holds a 44% "Rotten" approval rating on review aggregator Rotten Tomatoes based on 16 reviews. On Metacritic, it holds a rating of 54 out of 100 based on 10 reviews, indicating "Mixed or average reviews." According to Mary G. Hurd, the film "is loaded with sight gags, one liners, numerous sexual jokes, and puns". But many critics found it to be a comedy which relies on sophomoric humor. According to Gwendolyn Audrey Foster, the film is both a gangster comedy and an homage to 1930s gangster films, but is perhaps too clever for a mainstream audience. According to Leigh Hallisey, the film is a parody of "old-school" gangster films and reveals Heckerling's awareness of their conventions and stereotypes. Foster finds the comedies of Amy Heckerling to rely on "fast-paced, witty repartee and droll humor", and draws comparisons to those of Frank Tashlin and Jerry Lewis.

Martin F. Norden considers the film to be part of a trend in 1980s comedies, linking disability to humor. He notes that the film contains numerous gags of this nature. He spotlights a running gag, concerning a blind newspaper vendor played by Ray Walston. He starts out blind but a bundle of newspapers hits him on the head, causing him to regain his sight. A repetition of the accident then leaves him deaf. Another repetition restores his sight and hearing but causes him to suffer amnesia.

References

Bibliography

External links

 
 
 

1984 films
1980s crime comedy films
American crime comedy films
1980s English-language films
Films directed by Amy Heckerling
Films scored by John Morris
Films set in 1910
Films set in 1935
Films set in New York City
Mafia comedy films
20th Century Fox films
1984 comedy films
Films set in a movie theatre
1980s American films